The Historic Aircraft Restoration Museum, located at Creve Coeur Airport in Maryland Heights, Missouri, United States, is dedicated to restoring and preserving historical aircraft. The airplanes in the collection are all fabric-covered, and most are biplanes from the inter-war years (the "Golden age of flight"). The museum's volunteers maintain most of these aircraft in full working order. This is one of the largest collections of flying classic aircraft in America.

Collection
The museum collection concentrates on civil aircraft from the inter-war years, with most of the aircraft originating from 1916 to 1946. There are several Waco biplanes, with the oldest of these types being a WACO 10, which was built in 1928. The oldest airplane on display is a Standard J-1 that was built in 1917 and was used in the movies The Rocketeer and The Great Waldo Pepper.

Several of the preserved aircraft are the only surviving airworthy examples of their type.

Aircraft rides are available at the museum by request, in either a de Havilland  DH82 Tiger Moth or in a North American SNJ-5.

Aircraft on display

 Aeronca K
 Atlantic DH-4M-2A
 Antonov An-2
 Antonov An-2
 Canadian JN-4C Canuck
 Culver Cadet LCA
 Curtiss-Robertson Robin
 Curtiss-Wright 16E-3 Light Sport
 Curtiss-Wright CW-1 Junior – replica
 Curtiss-Wright CW-15C Sedan
 de Havilland DH.89A Dragon Rapide
 Driggs Dart II
 Fairchild 24 C8A
 Fairchild 71
 Fairchild KR-21B
 Fairchild KR-31
 Flagg F.13
 Fleet Fawn
 Funk B-85-C Bee
 Laister-Kauffman LK-10A
 Meyers MAC-145
 Mono Monosport 2
 Monocoupe D-145
 Monocoupe Model 90-A8
 Monocoupe Model 90L
 Monocoupe 110
 Nicholas-Beazley NB-8G
 Pietenpol Air Camper
 Piper PA-11 Cub Special
 Piper PA-15 Vagabond
 Rearwin Sportster
 Rutan Long-EZ
 Ryan M-1 – replica
 Ryan ST-3KR
 SAI KZ III
 Shavrov Sh-2
 Sopwith Pup – replica
 St. Louis Cardinal
 Standard J-1
 Star Cavalier A
 Star Cavalier E
 Stinson SR-6 Reliant
 Stinson SM-8A Junior
 Taylor E-2 Cub
 Timm Collegiate
 Travel Air 2000
 Travel Air 3000
 Waco ATO
 Waco ATO
 Waco AVN-8
 Waco Cootie – replica
 Waco CSO
 Waco CTO
 Waco GXE
 Waco JWM
 Waco QCF-2
 Waco QCF-2
 Waco RNF
 Waco UBF-2
 Waco YKC
 Waco YKS-7
 Yakovlev Yak-52
 Yakovlev Yak-52
 Zenith Z-6-A

Gallery

See also
 Shuttleworth Collection

References

Citations

Bibliography

External links

Historic Aircraft Restoration Museum – Museum website
Very high resolution panoramic images: Hangar 1, Hangar 2, Hangar 3
Linda Shiner People and Planes of Creve Coeur Air & Space Magazine, July 1, 2005
 Craftsmanship: Old-Style Restoration – AOPA

Aerospace museums in Missouri
Museums in St. Louis County, Missouri
Tourist attractions in St. Louis